Goboea is a genus of moths belonging to the family Tortricidae.

Species
Goboea copiosana Walker, 1866

See also
List of Tortricidae genera

References

External links
tortricidae.com

Tortricidae genera
Epitymbiini